This is a list of mayors of Mainz, including the Lord Mayors (Oberbürgermeister von Mainz) since 1796.

1796–1800: Fredrick Pongrass
1800–1814: Franz Macké
1814–1831: Franz Freiherr Gedult von Jungenfeld
1831–1834: Franz Macké
1834–1836: Stephan Metz
1837–1838: Johann Baptist Heinrich
1839–1841: Stephan Metz
1842–1860: Nikolaus Nack
1861–1864: Karl Schmitz
1865–1871: Franz Schott
1871–1872: Karl Racké
1872–1877: Carl Wallau
1877–1885: Alexis Dumont
1885–1894: Georg Oechsner
1894–1905: Heinrich Gassner
1905–1919: Karl Göttelmann
1919–1931: Karl Külb
1931–1933: Wilhelm Ehrhard
1934–1942: Robert Barth
1942–1945: Heinrich Ritter
1945: Rudolph Walther
1945–1949: Emil Kraus
1949–1965: Franz Stein
1965–1987: Jakob "Jockel" Fuchs
1987–1997: Herman-Hartmut Weyel
1997–2011:Jens Beutel the first who was elected to the position directly by the citizens. 
2012 until today: Michael Ebling

See also
 Timeline of Mainz

References 

History of Mainz
Mainz
Rhineland-Palatinate-related lists